Toni Kroos (born 4 January 1990) is a German professional footballer who plays as a midfielder for La Liga club Real Madrid. Widely regarded as one of the greatest midfielders of his generation, Kroos plays mainly as a central midfielder, but has also been deployed as a deep-lying playmaker in his career. He is known for his vision, passing, creativity, crossing and set-piece ability.

Kroos began his senior club career playing for Bayern Munich, where he made his debut at age 17 in 2007. He was sparingly used, and opted for an 18-month loan spell at fellow Bundesliga side Bayer Leverkusen, where he became a key contributor, and returned to his parent club with an increased profile in 2010. With Bayern, Kroos won two consecutive league titles (three titles in total), a UEFA Champions League title, two DFB-Pokal titles, and was voted into the league team of the season three times. In 2014, he joined Real Madrid in a transfer worth €25 million.

In Madrid, Kroos won sixteen trophies, including three La Liga titles and four UEFA Champions League titles, three of which he won consecutively from 2016 and 2018, each time being selected in the competition's team of the season. He has been selected in the FIFPro World11 and UEFA Team of the Year three times, and the league's team of the season twice. He was voted the IFFHS World's Best Playmaker in 2014 and German Footballer of the Year in 2018.

Kroos won Golden Player at the 2006 UEFA European Under-17 Championship, where he also finished as top goalscorer, and won the Golden Ball at the 2007 FIFA U-17 World Cup. He made his senior debut for Germany in 2010, at age 20, and appeared in five major tournaments. Kroos helped Germany win the 2014 FIFA World Cup, where he was top assist provider and voted to the All-Star Team, Dream Team, and German Player of the Year. At UEFA Euro 2016, he was selected to the Team of the Tournament. He announced his international retirement after his team's elimination from Euro 2020 in 2021.

Club career

Early career
Kroos first played for local club Greifswalder SC, later transferring to the youth team of Hansa Rostock. Kroos moved to Bayern Munich's youth setup in 2006. Kroos was missing up to 40 days during the school year due to training.

For the 2007–08 season, at the age of 17, Kroos was promoted to Bayern's senior team. He made an astounding start to his Bundesliga career, making his debut for Bayern on 26 September 2007 in a 5–0 defeat of Energie Cottbus and twice assisting Miroslav Klose goals within 18 minutes of his appearance as a substitute. At the time of his debut, Kroos was the youngest player ever to represent Bayern in a professional match at  old, a record since broken by David Alaba in 2010.

On 25 October, Kroos earned Bayern a valuable victory away to Red Star Belgrade on his UEFA Cup debut, coming on as a substitute in the 81st minute and providing an assist for Miroslav Klose and then scoring the winning goal, his first for the club, in stoppage time. He made his first start for the club in a 3–1 defeat away at VfB Stuttgart.

Kroos ended his first season with 20 appearances for Bayern, including six starts. He also scored three goals in 12 appearances for Bayern Munich II in the Regionalliga Süd.

Despite being selected to start in Bayern's opening 2008–09 Bundesliga match against Hamburger SV, Kroos appeared less frequently for die Roten during the first half of the 2008–09 season. On 5 November 2008, however, he made his UEFA Champions League debut as a 79th-minute substitute against Fiorentina in matchday four of the group stage.

Loan at Bayer Leverkusen
On 31 January 2009, Bayern allowed Kroos to join Bayer Leverkusen on an 18-month loan to gain first team experience. He made his debut on 28 February as a substitute in a 1–0 defeat against Hannover 96. On 12 April, he made his first Bundesliga start for Leverkusen, assisting the team's goal in a 1–1 draw with Werder Bremen. On 18 April 2009, he scored his first Bundesliga goal in a 2–1 loss to VfL Wolfsburg.

On 30 May, Kroos appeared as a late substitute in the 2009 DFB-Pokal Final against Werder Bremen, where Leverkusen were beaten 1–0 by a Mesut Özil goal.

During the 2008–09 season, Kroos made 13 appearances for Leverkusen in all competitions, scoring once.

Kroos established himself as a regular in the Leverkusen team in 2009–10, appearing all but one of Bayer's Bundesliga matches. Between matchdays 16 and 20, Kroos registered five goals and four assists in five Bundesliga matches, earning him back-to-back "player of the month" awards from kicker for December 2009 and January 2010.

He ended the season with nine goals and 12 assists from 33 matches.

Bayern Munich

In the summer of 2010, on the expiration of his loan at Bayer Leverkusen, Kroos returned to Bayern Munich. When asked about his first team chances with Bayern, runner-up in the previous season's Champions League, Kroos stated, "I want to play as often as possible!"

On 16 August 2010, he started against Germania Windeck in the first round of the DFB-Pokal, scoring the third goal in a 4–0 victory. On 29 October 2010, he scored his first league goal for the club, in a 4–1 win for the Bavarians against SC Freiburg. During the 2010–11 season, Kroos was a regular starter for Bayern in the Bundesliga, DFB-Pokal and Champions League. He ended the season with 37 appearances in all competitions.

During 2011–12, under Jupp Heynckes, his former coach at Leverkusen, Kroos established himself as a first choice player from Bayern, forming a strong midfield partnership with national team colleague Bastian Schweinsteiger. He played 51 matches in all competitions during the season, including the 2012 UEFA Champions League Final, where Bayern were beaten on penalties by Chelsea at the Allianz Arena.

Kroos was an important member of Bayern's treble-winning team during the 2012–13 season. As the most advanced member of a midfield containing Schweinsteiger and Javi Martínez, Kroos scored three goals in the team's opening four Bundesliga matches. He also scored his first Champions League goal in Bayern's opening group match against Valencia. After sustaining an injury in the first leg of the Champions League quarter-final against Juventus, Kroos was unavailable for the remainder of the season, missing Bayern's successes in the 2013 UEFA Champions League Final, the 2013 DFB-Pokal Final and the last seven matches of the Bundesliga season.

Kroos returned to fitness for the start of the 2013–14 season and, played in the German Super Cup and the UEFA Super Cup. On 4 October 2013, scored his first goal of the season in a 1–1 draw against former club Bayer Leverkusen in the Bundesliga. He started two matches for Bayern in the 2013 FIFA Club World Cup. The first against Guangzhou Evergrande in the 3–0 semi-final win on 17 December 2013, and in the final as the team beat Raja Casablanca 2–0.

On 19 February 2014, Kroos scored his second goal of the season in a 2–0 Champions League win against Arsenal. On 25 March, he scored in a 3–1 win over Hertha BSC as Bayern were confirmed as Bundesliga champions.

Real Madrid

2014–15: Debut season

Prior to joining Real Madrid, Kroos had a deal in place to join Manchester United after agreeing terms with David Moyes. However, after Moyes was sacked and Louis van Gaal replaced him, the Dutch manager decided against signing Kroos. Around the time of the 2014 World Cup he received a call from Carlo Ancelotti.

On 17 July 2014, Spanish La Liga club Real Madrid announced that they had reached an agreement for the transfer of Kroos, signing a six-year deal for an undisclosed fee. The press reported that Kroos had cost between €24 and €30 million. Greifswalder SV 04, the successor to his first youth team, received €60,000 from the transfer.

Kroos became the ninth German player, after Günter Netzer, Paul Breitner, Uli Stielike, Bernd Schuster, Bodo Illgner, Christoph Metzelder, Mesut Özil, and Sami Khedira, to join Real Madrid. At his presentation in front of 8,000 supporters, he stated how Real Madrid is the "biggest club in the world" and is a "cut above Bayern". He played in his debut match against Sevilla in the 2014 UEFA Super Cup on 12 August 2014, winning his first trophy at Real Madrid.

He was part of a midfield trio with James Rodríguez and Luka Modrić that led Real Madrid to 22-game winning run late in the year. On 8 November, Kroos scored his first goal for Real Madrid in a 5–1 win over Rayo Vallecano, at home. In December, he helped the team win the 2014 FIFA Club World Cup, leading the tournament in assists. He was named to the FIFPro World XI and the UEFA Team of the Year.

2015–19: Sustained domestic success and European dominance
In 2015, Ancelotti was replaced by Rafa Benítez in Madrid's command. Benítez was replaced in the middle of the season by Zinedine Zidane, under whom Kroos continued to be a key midfield player. Zidane said "We signed Toni because we want him to mark an era" and called Kroos "perfect for Madrid". He was a regular starter when the team won the 2015–16 Champions League, his second Champions League trophy. Los Blancos triumph at San Siro meant that Kroos became the first-ever German to lift the Champions League trophy with two clubs.

On 12 October 2016, he signed a new contract until 2022, and by the end of the year he was once again nominated to the FIFPro World XI and the UEFA Team of the Year. He scored the winning goal for Real Madrid in the 81-minute of the game against Celta Vigo as Real Madrid won their first home game of the La Liga season by 2–1.

He was a regular starter when Madrid won the 2016–17 La Liga and later defended their title in the 2016–17 Champions League. He became the first German player to win the trophy three times. At the end of 2016–17, Kroos was the most used player under Zidane.

During the 2017–18 UEFA Champions League, he made twelve appearances, when Madrid won their third consecutive and 13th overall Champions League title.

2019–present: Return of Zidane and Ancelotti & record sixth FIFA Club World Cup title
On 22 December 2018, Kroos won his record fifth FIFA Club World Cup after his team defeated Al Ain FC with a 4–1 margin in the final. On 20 May 2019, he extended his contract with the club until 2023.

On 17 August 2019, Kroos opened his goal account for the campaign in the La Liga season opener against Celta Vigo at Balaídos in a 3–1 win with a long range effort. On 22 October 2019, he scored the winning goal in a 1–0 victory over Galatasaray in his 100th appearance in the Champions League.

On 8 January 2020, Kroos scored his first Supercopa goal directly from a corner kick against Valencia in the 2019–20 Supercopa de España Semi-final in Jeddah as Los Blancos won 3–1. Three days later, Real Madrid won the Supercopa after beating the local rivals Atlético Madrid on penalties. On 16 February, Kroos again scored against Celta Vigo, this time at the Bernabeu in a 2–2 league draw. This was his sixth goal against the Galician club, meaning he had scored against them more than any other team in his career.

On 16 June, when La Liga restarted after a three-month hiatus due to the COVID-19 pandemic, Kroos scored Real Madrid's first official goal at the Alfredo Di Stéfano Stadium in just four minutes in an eventual 3–1 win over Eibar. One month later, Real Madrid went on a 10 game winning run and won the 2019–20 La Liga with Kroos featuring in all 11 matches post lockdown. On 8 August, Kroos' season came to an end as City eliminated Madrid in the Champions League Round of 16 (4–2 on aggregate). Despite a disappointing end to the season, this was Kroos' most prolific season in White netting six goals across all competitions.

On 10 April 2021, Kroos scored his first El Clásico goal against Barcelona which came from a free-kick in the 28th minute at the Di Stefano Stadium which proved to be the winner in a vital 2–1 league win to send Los Blancos to the top of the league. This was Kroos' first free kick goal for Real Madrid in just his sixth attempt. In the 2021–22 UEFA Champions League, Kroos won his fifth title in the competition, scoring two goals in twelve appearances.

On 10 August 2022, Kroos started the 2022–23 season by winning his fourth UEFA Super Cup against Eintracht Frankfurt. This match would prove to be significant because it was the last time the famous trio commonly known by fans as KCM (Kroos, Casemiro and Modrić) would start a match together. Casemiro would move on to Manchester United a week later.

On the first matchday of the 2022–23 UEFA Champions League season, Kroos received the UEFA Man of the Match for his performance against Celtic at Celtic Park.

On 11 September 2022, Kroos captained Real Madrid for the first time in a 4–1 home win against RCD Mallorca after club captain Karim Benzema had been injured and the reserve captains (Nacho and Modrić) started on the bench. On 16 October, he played his 250th La Liga match in a 3–1 El Clásico win over Barcelona. On 30 October, Kroos received the first red card of his professional career in a 1–1 home draw against Girona after he received a second yellow card for a foul on Aleix García.

On 11 February 2023, Kroos broke his own record by gaining his sixth FIFA Club World Cup title, one with Bayern Munich and five with Real Madrid.

International career

Youth teams
In the 2007 FIFA U-17 World Cup, Toni Kroos was awarded the Golden Ball as the tournament's best player and also won the Bronze Shoe after scoring five goals. Kroos' debut for the national U-21 team came on 5 September 2008 in a 2009 Euro U-21 Championship Qualifier against Northern Ireland and scored the opening goal in the 11th minute, his second goal for the U-21 side was goal in Germany's 1–0 win over Italy, a precise long-range shot in the angle. It came as a surprise that coach Horst Hrubesch left him out of Germany's U-21 squad for Euro 2009, and Germany went on to win the tournament without him.

2010 World Cup
In January 2010, Kroos was called up to the senior Germany team for the first time, for a training session in Sindelfingen and was named in the squad for the following match, a friendly against Argentina on 3 March 2010, in which he subsequently made his debut for the national side.

Kroos was selected to Joachim Löw's 23-man squad for the 2010 FIFA World Cup in South Africa. He made his FIFA World Cup debut in Germany's final group-stage match versus Ghana, coming on in the 80th minute for Bastian Schweinsteiger, with Germany leading 1–0. He made further appearances as a substitute in the quarter-finals against Argentina, in the semi-finals against Spain and in the third place play-off against Uruguay.

Euro 2012

Kroos established himself as a regular starter in Germany's qualification campaign for UEFA Euro 2012, playing in eight out of a possible ten games. Germany won all ten qualifying matches to top group A. After qualification was already ensured, Kroos scored his first two international goals, both with his strong right foot. Notably, both Kroos' goals were Germany's first after falling behind in the respective matches, both of which were drawn away friendlies, against the two Euro 2012 hosts – Poland and Ukraine. National coach Joachim Löw also praised him: "How Toni distributes the ball, how he receives it, is very good. He's technically excellent ... He has made progress in the last few matches, I'm extremely satisfied with the player."

At the tournament finals, Kroos appeared as a substitute in all three of Germany's Group B matches. For the semi-final match against Italy, Löw selected the naturally attacking Kroos to man mark Italy's playmaker Andrea Pirlo. The decision was heavily criticised as Germany lost the match 2–1.

2014 World Cup
During Germany's 2014 World Cup qualifying campaign, Kroos scored his first two competitive international goals in a 6–1 win over the Republic of Ireland in Dublin. On 6 September 2013, he scored the team's second goal in a 3–0 win over Austria.

Kroos was named in Germany's squad for the 2014 World Cup. In the team's opening match, a 4–0 defeat of Portugal, Kroos started in midfield and assisted Mats Hummels for Germany's second goal. Then in the quarter final the only goal scored by Mats Hummels against France came from his free kick. In the semi-final against the host nation Brazil, Kroos scored two goals two minutes apart (24' and 26') in Germany's 7–1 win. He also recorded his fourth assist of the tournament, crossing for Thomas Müller's opening goal, and was named man of the match by FIFA. Kroos has been nicknamed Garçom ("waiter" in Portuguese) by the Brazilians for precisely delivering most passes to the strikers.

On 11 July, Kroos was named on the ten-man shortlist for FIFA's Golden Ball award for the tournament's best player.

The Castrol Performance Index, the official statistical analyser of the World Cup, rated Kroos as the best player at the 2014 World Cup, with a rating of 9.79 out of 10.

Kroos is considered the only player from the former German Democratic Republic to ever win the World Cup.

2018 World Cup
On 4 June 2018, Kroos was included in Germany's final 23-man squad for the 2018 FIFA World Cup. On 23 June, Kroos scored from a free-kick in stoppage time against Sweden to resurrect Germany's World Cup hopes with a 2–1 victory. But in their next and last group stage match, his side were knocked out by South Korea after losing 2–0 four days later.

2020–21 UEFA Nations League
On 13 October 2020, Kroos played his 100th match for Germany in a 3–3 draw against Switzerland in the 2020–21 UEFA Nations League A.

Euro 2020
On 19 May 2021, he was selected to the squad for the UEFA Euro 2020.

Three days after the team lost 0–2 against England in the Round of 16 on 29 June, Kroos announced his retirement from international football.

Style of play

A tall and athletic right-footed midfielder, Kroos is known for the range and accuracy of his distribution with either foot, his technique, vision, creativity, reading of the game, and his ability to dictate play in midfield or set up goals with his passing and ball delivery from set-pieces; he is also capable of scoring goals himself, courtesy of his striking ability – in particular from long range – and his accuracy from free kicks. He has been described by Jonathan Wilson as "perhaps the archetype of the modern attacking midfielder". Wilson has also described Kroos as "dynamic and hardworking", and has praised him for his versatility, physical strength and ability to play in several midfield positions: in addition to his usual role, he has also been used in the centre as a deep-lying playmaker, on the flank, in a box-to-box role, or even as a defensive midfielder, due to his ability to both break up play, retain possession, and create chances for teammates. Former Manchester United midfielder Paul Scholes said in 2014 that Kroos, "a top-class central midfielder", was the player that United most needed to sign.

Former Netherlands captain Johan Cruyff said of Kroos' performances at the 2014 World Cup, "He's doing everything right: the pace in his passes is great and he sees everything. It's nearly perfect."

Personal life
Kroos was born in Greifswald, Mecklenburg-Vorpommern, on 4 January 1990. He has a younger brother, Felix Kroos, who was also a professional footballer. His father Roland works as youth coach for Hansa Rostock. During his youth, he was a mediocre student and spent a lot of time practicing football, however, he was well-behaved in class and well liked among his peers at school.

Kroos married his long-term girlfriend Jessica Farber on 13 June 2015. They have two sons and a daughter. He owns a house on the island of Mallorca.

Career statistics
Club

International
Source:

Scores and results list Germany's goal tally first.

HonoursBayern Munich Bundesliga: 2007–08, 2012–13, 2013–14
 DFB-Pokal: 2007–08, 2012–13, 2013–14
 DFL-Supercup: 2012
 UEFA Champions League: 2012–13
 UEFA Super Cup: 2013
 FIFA Club World Cup: 2013Real Madrid La Liga: 2016–17, 2019–20, 2021–22
 Supercopa de España: 2017, 2019–20, 2021–22
 UEFA Champions League: 2015–16, 2016–17, 2017–18, 2021–22
 UEFA Super Cup: 2014, 2017, 2022
 FIFA Club World Cup: 2014, 2016, 2017, 2018, 2022Germany FIFA World Cup: 2014 third place: 2010Individual'''
 UEFA European Under-17 Championship Golden Player: 2006
 UEFA European Under-17 Championship Top Scorer: 2007
 FIFA U-17 World Cup Golden Ball: 2007
 FIFA U-17 World Cup Bronze Shoe: 2007
 Fritz-Walter-Medal U18 Gold Medal: 2008
 kicker'' Bundesliga Team of the Season: 2009–10, 2011–12, 2013–14
 UEFA Champions League Squad of the Season: 2013–14, 2014–15, 2015–16, 2016–17, 2017–18
 FIFA FIFPro World11: 2014, 2016, 2017
 UEFA Team of the Year: 2014, 2016, 2017
 IFFHS World's Best Playmaker: 2014
 FIFA World Cup All-Star Team: 2014
 FIFA World Cup Dream Team: 2014
 Silbernes Lorbeerblatt: 2014
 German Player of the Year: 2014
 UEFA European Championship Team of the Tournament: 2016
 UEFA La Liga Team of the Season: 2016–17, 2019–20
 IFFHS World Team of the Decade 2011–2020
 IFFHS UEFA Team of the Decade 2011–2020
 German Footballer of the Year: 2018
GQ German Athlete of the Year: 2019

See also
 List of footballers with 100 or more UEFA Champions League appearances
 List of men's footballers with 100 or more international caps

References

External links

  
 Profile at Real Madrid CF
 Toni Kroos at kicker.de 
 
 

1990 births
Living people
People from Greifswald
Footballers from Mecklenburg-Western Pomerania
German footballers
Germany youth international footballers
Germany under-21 international footballers
Germany international footballers
Association football midfielders
Greifswalder SV 04 players
FC Bayern Munich II players
FC Bayern Munich footballers
Bayer 04 Leverkusen players
Real Madrid CF players
Regionalliga players
3. Liga players
Bundesliga players
La Liga players
UEFA Champions League winning players
2010 FIFA World Cup players
UEFA Euro 2012 players
2014 FIFA World Cup players
UEFA Euro 2016 players
2018 FIFA World Cup players
UEFA Euro 2020 players
FIFA World Cup-winning players
FIFA Century Club
German expatriate footballers
Expatriate footballers in Spain
German expatriate sportspeople in Spain